Denis Mihai Drăguș (born 6 July 1999) is a Romanian professional footballer who plays as a forward for Italian  club Genoa, on loan from the Belgian First Division A club Standard Liège.

Club career

Viitorul Constanța
Drăguș made his senior debut for Viitorul Constanța on 29 October 2015, in a 1–0 win over Botoșani in the Cupa României. He played his first Liga I game on 27 August 2017, coming on as a substitute for Aurelian Chițu in the 87th minute of a 1–2 loss to Concordia Chiajna. On 28 November 2017, Drăguș scored his first career goal in a 2–3 loss to Botoșani also in the national cup.

Standard Liège
On 7 August 2019, Drăguș joined Belgian team Standard Liège for a rumoured fee of €2 million plus 30% interest from a future transfer. He recorded his debut for Les Rouches on 1 September 2019, in a 0–1 loss to Anderlecht at the Constant Vanden Stock Stadium. 

On 15 September 2020, Drăguș agreed to a one-season loan with an option to buy at Crotone. He made his Serie A debut five days later, in a 1–4 defeat to Genoa. On 17 October 2020, Drăguș tested positive for COVID-19. He totalled nine appearances during his stint in Italy, of which only one as a starter. 

Upon his return to Liège, Drăguș netted his first goal for Standard in a 2–5 loss to Antwerp on 8 August 2021. On 16 January 2022, he scored an 89th-minute equaliser in a 1–1 league draw at Anderlecht.

On 26 January 2023, Drăguș moved on loan to Genoa in Italy, with an option to buy.

International career
On 10 September 2018, Drăguș made his full debut for Romania in a 2–2 UEFA Nations League draw with Serbia. The following year, he was meant to represent the under-21 team at the 2019 UEFA European Championship, but was ruled out from the squad with a calcaneus fracture.

Personal life
Drăguș's father, Mihai, was also a professional footballer. In January 2021, his girlfriend Vanessa gave birth to a baby girl.

Career statistics

Club

International

Scores and results list Romania's goal tally first, score column indicates score after each Drăguș goal.

Honours
Viitorul Constanța
Cupa României: 2018–19
Supercupa României: 2019

References

External links

1999 births
Living people
Footballers from Bucharest
Romanian footballers
Association football forwards
Association football wingers
Liga I players
FC Viitorul Constanța players 
Belgian Pro League players
Standard Liège players
Serie A players
Serie B players
F.C. Crotone players
Genoa C.F.C. players
Romania youth international footballers
Romania under-21 international footballers
Romania international footballers 
Romanian expatriate footballers 
Expatriate footballers in Belgium 
Expatriate footballers in Italy 
Romanian expatriate sportspeople in Belgium
Romanian expatriate sportspeople in Italy